Thuidiopsis sparsa is a species of moss in the family Thuidiaceae. The natural distribution includes Australia, Papua New Guinea, New Zealand and nearby islands.

References 

Hypnales
Plants described in 1925
Flora of Australia
Flora of New Zealand
Flora of Papua New Guinea